The Socialist Workers' Party of Turkey (TSİP) is an anti-revisionist Marxist–Leninist communist party in Turkey.

The Socialist Workers' Party of Turkey was  founded on 16 June 1974, but the party was closed following the 1980 coup. The TSİP was reestablished on 3 January 1993 by old members of the party.

References

External links

1974 establishments in Turkey
1993 establishments in Turkey
Communist parties in Turkey
Anti-revisionist organizations
Stalinist parties
Far-left politics in Turkey
Anti-imperialist organizations
Political parties established in 1974
Political parties established in 1993